Troy School District may refer to:
Troy School District (Michigan) in Troy, Michigan
Troy School District (New York) in Troy, New York
Troy School District (Idaho) in Troy, Idaho
Troy Area School District in Troy, Pennsylvania
Lincoln County R-III School District in Troy, Missouri